Fort Union Trading Post National Historic Site is a partial reconstruction of the most important fur trading post on the upper Missouri, 1829-1867. The fort site is about two miles from the confluence of the Missouri River and its tributary, the Yellowstone River, on the Dakota side of the North Dakota/Montana border, 25 miles from Williston, North Dakota.

In 1961, the site was designated by the Department of Interior as one of the earliest declared National Historic Landmarks in the United States. The National Park Service formally named it as Fort Union Trading Post to differentiate it from Fort Union National Monument, a historic frontier Army post in New Mexico.

The historic site interprets how portions of the fort may have looked in 1851, based on archaeological excavations and contemporary drawings. Among the sources were drawings by Swiss artist Rudolf Kurz, who worked as the post clerk in 1851.

History
Fort Union, possibly first known as Fort Henry or Fort Floyd, was built in 1828 or 1829 by the Upper Missouri Outfit managed by Kenneth McKenzie; it was capitalized by John Jacob Astor's American Fur Company, Astor having created a virtual monopoly in fur trading. 

Until 1867, Fort Union was the central, and busiest, trading post on the upper Missouri, instrumental in developing the fur trade in Montana.  Here Assiniboine, Crow, Cree, Ojibwe, Blackfoot, Hidatsa, Lakota, and other tribes traded buffalo robes and furs for trade goods. There was a market in manufactured beads, clay pipes, guns, blankets, knives, cookware, cloth, and alcohol. Historic visitors to the fort included John James Audubon, Sha-có-pay, Captain Joseph LaBarge, Kenneth McKenzie, Jesuit missionary Father Pierre-Jean De Smet, artist George Catlin, Sitting Bull, Karl Bodmer, Hugh Glass, and trader Jim Bridger.

At first, Indians traded beaver pelts for Euro-American goods because there was demand for beaver hats in the East and in Europe. During the 1830s, silk and woolen hats became more popular and demand for beaver pelts decreased. The trade shifted to bison robes.

During the historical period, Fort Union served as a haven for many frontier people and contributed to economic growth on the American northwestern frontier. As headquarters for the American Fur Company, it played a primary role in the growth of the fur trade. Fur trade entrepreneurs, such as Astor and successors, exerted considerable influence on government policies that affected the Indian nations of the region. The presence of the fort near the northern border of the United States also symbolized national sovereignty in the region.

The fort maintained a large inventory of firearms that were traded with Indian tribes for furs.  In turn, Indians used the firearms in hunting for furs and buffalo robes. Northern Plains Indians preferred the English-made "North West Gun," a smooth-bore flintlock, because of its reputation for quality and reliability.

Conflicts between Euro-American traders and Indians were less frequent around Fort Union than were conflicts among the Indian tribes themselves. However, during the summer of 1863, following the Dakota Wars of 1862, many tribes along the upper Missouri River became openly hostile to whites. At times Fort Union was nearly under siege, and the steamboats and their passengers were exposed to significant danger along the river.

See also
 Fort Buford, nearby site
 Missouri-Yellowstone Confluence Interpretive Center
 Fur trade in Montana
 List of National Historic Landmarks in Montana
 National Register of Historic Places listings in Roosevelt County, Montana
 List of National Historic Landmarks in North Dakota
 National Register of Historic Places listings in Richland County, North Dakota

References

Bibliography

Online sources

External links
 
 Fort Union Trading Post Historic Site at NPS.gov

IUCN Category III
Union Trading Post National Historic Site, Fort
History museums in North Dakota
Missouri River
Museums in Williams County, North Dakota
National Historic Landmarks in North Dakota
National Historic Landmarks in Montana
National Historic Sites in North Dakota
Native American museums in North Dakota
Pre-statehood history of North Dakota
Government buildings completed in 1829
Protected areas of Williams County, North Dakota
Protected areas of Roosevelt County, Montana
Trading posts in the United States
Commercial buildings on the National Register of Historic Places in North Dakota
Protected areas established in 1966
1966 establishments in Montana
1966 establishments in North Dakota
National Register of Historic Places in Williams County, North Dakota
National Register of Historic Places in Roosevelt County, Montana
American Fur Company
Forts along the Missouri River